The monastery of Santa Cristina de Ribas de Sil is a monastery in Galicia, Spain.

Monasteries in Galicia (Spain)